Reynard Motorsport vehicles

The Reynard 01I is an open-wheel racing car chassis designed and built by Reynard Racing Cars that competed in the 2001 IndyCar season. Gil de Ferran won the drivers' title in the car, and Team Penske won the constructors' title.

References

American Championship racing cars
Reynard Motorsport vehicles